Life Goes On is the third studio album by American R&B singer Donell Jones. It was released by LaFace Records on June 4, 2002, in the United States. The album featured two singles, "You Know that I Love You", which was a minor hit in both the US and the UK and "Put Me Down", a more popular non-album version featuring Styles P and Lady May. The album reached number 3 on the US Billboard 200 and went gold. On September 16, 2003, Arista Records re-released Life Goes On with the bonus track, "I'll Go", which first appeared on the Love & Basketball soundtrack.

Critical reception

AllMusic editor Stephen Thomas Erlewine rated the album four out of five stars. He called the project another "consistently satisfying" effort within Jones' discography and added: "Jones may not be as flashy as some of his modern soul peers [...] but that's what makes his records work, and what makes Life Goes On another fine addition to his catalog." Craig Seymour from Entertainment Weekly noted that the album "uses fluid '80s grooves for tales of straying lovers, reformed commitment-phobes, and incarcerated romantics. With his tenderly earnest young-Stevie Wonder-like delivery and consistently sharp lyrics, Jones hits the right notes."

Chart performance
Life Goes On debuted and peaked at number three on the US Billboard 200 in the week of June 13, 2002, with first week sales of 110,000 units. It marked Jones' first top ten album in the United States as well as his biggest sales week yet. The album also reached number two on the Top R&B/Hip-Hop Albums chart. On January 11, 2006, Life Goes On was certified Gold by the Recording Industry Association of America (RIAA). By May 2006, the album had sold 610,000 copies in the US.

Track listing

Notes
  signifies a co-producer

Charts

Weekly charts

Year-end charts

Certifications

References

External links
[ Life Goes On] at Allmusic

Donell Jones albums
2002 albums